The 1962 Honduran football season was the fifteenth edition of the Honduran Amateur League, won by C.D.S. Vida, after defeating Salamar from San Lorenzo in a final match played in Tegucigalpa.

Regional champions

Known results

Second round
Played in two sub-groups of three teams each between the regional champions where the winners advanced to the Final.

Known results

Final

Vida's lineup

References

Liga Amateur de Honduras seasons
Honduras
1962 in Honduran sport